Several Major League Soccer teams and players hold various records and statistics.

MLS Cup and Supporters' Shield winners

MLS Cup finals

Teams with most trophies

Player records (career) 

Bold indicates an active player. All statistics are for regular season only.

Goals

As of the end of the 2022 regular season.

Goals from free kicks

Assists

As of the end of the 2022 regular season.

Minutes played 

As of the end of the 2022 regular season.

Goals against average

As of the end of the 2020 regular season; minimum 75 matches played.

Player records (single season) 
All statistics are for regular season only.

Most goals

Most assists

Most shutouts

All-time regular season success 

 Supporters' Shield Standings through 2022 season.
 Miami Fusion and Tampa Bay Mutiny folded after completion of the 2001 season.
 Chivas USA folded after completion of the 2014 season.

All-time regular season table 
Through completion of 2022 regular season.

1 – Ranking based number of points per season.
2 – Includes shoot-out wins from 1996–1999 season.
3 – Includes shoot-out losses from 1996–1999 seasons.
4 – Based on combined conference results before single format for playoff qualification was inaugurated in 2007.

All-time playoffs success 
Through 2022 playoffs.

 Shows number of best finishes at each playoff level through completion of 2022 playoffs. Does not include the 2020 "Play-In Round."

All-time playoffs table 
Through 2020 playoffs.

1 – Ranking based on overall number of points.
2 – Includes shoot-out wins from 1996–1999 seasons. Post-1999 shoot-out wins counted as ties.
3 – Includes shoot-out losses from 1996–1999 seasons. Post-1999 shoot-out losses counted as ties.

Team records (single season)

Points

 All stats are from regular season games only.
 From 1996 to 1999, a shoot-out was used to determine the winner of a match if it was a tie after 90 minutes.
 From 2000 to 2003, a 10-minute golden goal period was used to determine the winner of a match if it was a tie after 90 minutes.
In 2020, teams played a shortened season and unequal number of between 18 and 23 games.

1 – Points earned during shootout era

2 – Points earned during shortened 2020 season.

3 – Did not win Supporters' Shield

Results

Wins

1 – Includes shoot-out wins in seasons played from 1996–1999.

Losses

1 – Includes shoot-out losses in seasons played from 1996–1999.

Ties

1 – No ties in seasons played from 1996–1999.

Goals

Most for

Fewest for

1 – Goals scored during shortened 2020 season.

Fewest allowed

Most allowed

1 – Goals scored during shortened 2020 season.

Best differential

Worst differential

Single game records

Highest scoring games

Most goals scored by a team

Biggest winning margin

Longest streaks

Consecutive postseason berths

Winning streaks

 The longest winning start to a season was achieved by the LA Galaxy in 1996, who opened the campaign with twelve consecutive wins and won their first eight games in regulation.
 The longest winning end to a season was achieved by the LA Galaxy in 1997, who closed the campaign with six straight wins.

Undefeated streaks

 The longest unbeaten start to a season was achieved by the Seattle Sounders FC in 2021. The Sounders opened their campaign with thirteen unbeaten matches (eight wins and five draws).
 The longest unbeaten end to a season was achieved by Columbus Crew SC in 2004, who closed the campaign after eighteen matches unbeaten (eight wins and ten draws).

Home undefeated streaks

 Only regular season MLS matches count towards individual team records records.

Notes

Losing streaks

 The longest losing start to a season was achieved by Toronto FC in 2012, who opened the campaign with nine consecutive losses.
 The longest losing end to a season was achieved by FC Cincinnati in 2021, who closed the campaign with twelve consecutive losses.

Tie streaks

 The longest streak of ties to start a season was achieved by the LA Galaxy in 2003, the New York Red Bulls in 2006, Columbus Crew SC in 2007, the Portland Timbers in 2015, the Colorado Rapids in 2015, New York City FC in 2019, and Nashville SC in 2021, who each opened their respective campaigns with three consecutive ties.
 The longest streak of ties to end a season was achieved by the San Jose Earthquakes in 2004 and the Montreal Impact in 2014, who each closed their respective campaigns with four consecutive ties.

Average season attendances

 Highest single match attendance: 74,479 (Charlotte FC vs. Los Angeles Galaxy, March 5, 2022)
 Highest average attendance: 53,002 (Atlanta United, 2018)
 Lowest average attendance: 7,063 (Chivas USA, 2014)
 Lowest single match attendance: 3,702 (Chivas USA vs. Portland Timbers, May 28, 2014)

Streaks 
 Graham Zusi is the longest-tenured player to have played with only one club (Sporting Kansas City).
 The longest road trip a team has played during the regular season was recorded by the Portland Timbers in 2019. They opened the season with twelve straight games on the road due to the completion of an expansion to Providence Park in the early part of the 2019 season.
 The record for longest home stand a team has played during the regular season is shared by the Chicago Fire in 2006 and Sporting Kansas City in 2011. They played nine consecutive games at home.
 The highest number of points achieved by a team at home during a regular season is 44 (14–2–1) by the New York Red Bulls in 2018. Previously, it was 42 (13–3–1) by Toronto FC in 2017.
 The highest number of points achieved by a team on the road during a regular season was 37 (13–3), by the LA Galaxy in 1998.
 The most draws achieved by a team during a regular season is 18, first by the Chicago Fire in 2014, and again by Nashville SC in 2021.
 The record number of consecutive games scored in by a player is 15, set by Josef Martínez for Atlanta United FC in 2019.

See also 
List of American and Canadian soccer champions

Notes

References

Works cited

External links 
RSSSF.com: USA – MLS All-Time Table (since 1996)
MLS Facts and Record Book

 
All-time football league tables